The Cold Crush Brothers are an American hip hop group that formed in 1978 in the Bronx, New York City. They were especially known for their memorable routines which included harmonies, melodies and stage-stomping performances. The Cold Crush Brothers still perform across the United States.

History

Formation and early years (1978–1981)
The Cold Crush brothers formed as a group in 1978. DJ Tony Tone was originally a member of The Brothers Disco featuring DJ Breakout, DJ Baron and the original Funky Four emcees featuring the first female emcee Sha-Rock, KK Rockwell, Keith Keith and Rahiem (who later joined Grandmaster Flash & The Furious Five). DJ Charlie Chase was first the DJ for the Furious Five for a very short time in 1979 after the Furious Five and Grandmaster Flash had disputes and Flash disbanded from the Furious Five. Then in 1978 DJ Tony Tone joined forces with DJ Charlie Chase and Easy AD left his partner Donald D (of Ice-T's group Rhyme Syndicate)and they disbanded breaking up the duo they called The Asalaam Brothers and joined the Cold Crush Brothers.

The original lineup consisted of the founder, The Original DJ Tony Tone, Supreme Easy A.D., DJ Charlie Chase, Whipper Whip, Mr. Tee, and Dot-A-Rock. Eventually, Whipper Whip and Dot-A-Rock would leave the Cold Crush Brothers and join DJ Grandwizard Theodore & the Fantastic Five, which they considered to be a more established group at the time. The Fantastic Five was originally the "L" Brothers, which consisted of DJ Mean Gene, DJ Cordio, DJ Grand Wizard Theodore, MC Smiley, Master Rob, the Original Kevie Kev and sometimes Busy Bee Starski. Mr Tee also left Cold Crush and Tony Tone, Easy A.D. and Charlie Chase brought in Grandmaster Caz (formerly DJ Casanova Fly), Almighty Kay Gee and J.D.L. to fill the vacancy's in the line up. Money Ray would be added to the group in the late '80s.

The Cold Crush Brothers became involved in one of hip hop's most historic moments when Joey Robinson, son of Sugar Hill Records founder Sylvia Robinson, happened to hear Big Bank Hank, a part-time club bouncer and former manager of Grandmaster Caz, rapping to a Cold Crush Brothers tape while working at a pizzeria in New Jersey. Robinson informed Hank that he was forming a group called the Sugar Hill Gang and asked if Hank would like to join.  Hank accepted, although he was not an MC. Hank then took Grandmaster Caz's rhymes and used them as his own with no agreement from Caz. Caz's lyrics landed in a song by the Sugar Hill Gang called "Rapper's Delight". The song became a huge hit in 1979 and was the first hip hop single to land on the Top 40 charts. Caz never received any credit or compensation for the rhymes that he contributed.

Because of the attention they began to attract, many groups would try to battle them to gain street credibility and for Hip Hop supremacy. This would lead to a fierce and well known rivalry with The Fantastic Five, culminating in a lyrical battle between the groups on July 3, 1981. The grand prize was $1000 cash. The Fantastic Romantic (as they later came to be known due to popularity with female audiences) Five won the battle but, as said by Grandmaster Caz, the Cold Crush Brothers "won the war". After tapes of their battle began to circulate in the street, the people clearly thought that the Cold Crush Brothers won the battle. This established the Cold Crush Brothers as one of the strongest underground Hip Hop crews of all time.

Wild Style and mainstream success (1982–1984)
The Cold Crush Brothers toured all five boroughs of New York City and as far as Boston before commercially releasing records. Their popularity was strengthened by the sales of their live performances that were recorded on cassette by Tape Master (Elvis Moreno). The Cold Crush Brothers live performances/shows were taped and distributed worldwide via word-of-mouth promotion and mailed out to people everywhere including men and women serving in the armed forces around the world. The Cold Crush Brothers were featured in the 1982 movie Wild Style, the seminal work depicting Hip Hop Culture. In the movie, the Cold Crush Brothers featured in a number of scenes, the most notable being the Cold Crush Brothers' face off against their nemesis, the Fantastic Five in the classic basketball court scene. The other scene was the Battle at the Dixie Club where the brothers flex their emceeing / rap muscle, once again showing their prowess in the hip hop/rap genre. A year after the movie was released, the Cold Crush Brothers took hip hop abroad with tour dates in Japan and Europe.

The Cold Crush Brothers began to release records commercially. The first single was "Weekend" on Elite Records and was released in the fall of 1982. It was a party and dance record that related to everyday working people and what families go through Monday–Friday. The Cold Crush four MCs would say in harmony the days of the week and then each one would take one day describe that weekday and what could happen; "Monday the train was late you hardly eat and you wished you stay in bed", the recording described ways to have fun on the weekends.

Another memorable moment of contribution of The Cold Crush Brothers was that they started the earliest foreign markets. The Cold Crush Brothers took 25 MCs, DJs, breakers, and bombers to Tokyo, Japan in 1983. This was one of the earliest foreign markets for hip hop other than La Belle, France. Although they had linguistic and cultural barriers, the Wild Style tour was a big success. Right after this, the Cold Crush Brothers were able to gain a CBS records, through the Tuff City Label. They were the first crew to do so, this was the first time in hip hop History that an independent hip hop record label and a major record company like CBS worked together.

Their second single, released in the fall of 1983, was "Punk Rock Rap" on Epic Records licensed by UK CBS Associated records overseas and in the United States on Tuff City Records and distributed by CBS Records. "Punk Rock Rap" was the first hip hop recording to fuse hip hop and rock and break the color barrier in hip hop. The recording introduced the sound of hip hop and rock to white youth in America and around the world. The Cold Crush Brothers Punk Rock Rap was so widely popular that at the time, up and coming hip hop artist Doug E. Fresh sampled the phrase, "Oh My God!" for his now classic hip hop classic single, The Show, released in 1985.

The Cold Crush Brothers most successful Cold Crush single to date is "Fresh, Wild, Fly & Bold", released in 1984, which sold 16,000 units in its first week of release; a big deal in the early '80s. A distribution dispute between Tuff City Records and Profile Records hindered the sales of the single with the most potential of reaching gold status.

In the spirit of spreading Hip Hop culture globally The Cold Crush Brothers were early and integral members of the worldwide Hip Hop organization called Ill Crew Universal.

Legacy
Rapper Jay-Z's 2001 single "Izzo (H.O.V.A.)" uses the Cold Crush Brothers as an example of the music industry's exploitation of artists: "Industry shady; it need to be taken over / Label owners hate me; I'm raisin' the status quo up / I'm overchargin' niggaz for what they did to the Cold Crush / Pay us like you owe us for all the years that you hoe'd us."

Money Ray died on October 3, 2002.

In 2008, "At the Dixie" from Wild Style was ranked at number 77 on VH1's 100 Greatest Songs of Hip Hop.

On September 24, 2016, DJ Tony Crush, of the Cold Crush Brothers, was inducted into the Smithsonian's National Museum of African American History and Culture. September 24, 2016 was the day the museum opened.

References

External links
 Discography
 RedefineHipHop: Cold Crush Brothers (Recorded Material Part 1 of 2)!! - (Part 2 of 2)
 
 

1978 establishments in New York City
Hip hop groups from New York City
Musical groups established in 1978
Musical groups from the Bronx